Rugby in Greece may refer to:

Rugby league in Greece
Rugby union in Greece